Dichelostemma congestum is a species of flowering plant known by the common name ookow or fork-toothed ookow. It is native to California, Oregon and Washington.

Its tall, thin, naked stem is topped with an inflorescence packed densely with six to 15 flowers, each about a centimeter wide and long, with usually six petal-like lobes in shades of bright purple.

It was first published in 1811 as Brodiaea congesta.

References

External links

 Calflora Database: Dichelostemma congestum (Fork Toothed Ookow,  ookow)
Jepson Manual Treatment of Dichelostemma congestum
USDA Plants Profile for Dichelostemma congestum (ookow)
Dichelostemma congestum — UC Photos gallery

congestum
Flora of British Columbia
Flora of California
Flora of Oregon
Flora of Washington (state)
Flora of the Sierra Nevada (United States)
Natural history of the California Coast Ranges
Taxa named by Carl Sigismund Kunth
Plants described in 1811
Flora without expected TNC conservation status